Aleksandra Radenovic (born in 1975 in Croatia) is a Swiss and Croatian biophysicist. Her research focuses on the development of experimental tools to study single-molecule biophysics. She is a professor of biological engineering at the École Polytechnique Fédérale de Lausanne (EPFL) and head of the Laboratory of Nanoscale Biology.

Career 
Radenovic studied physics at the University of Zagreb, where she wrote her Master thesis on Raman spectroscopy of beta-carotene. She then joined Giovanni Dietler's Laboratory of Physics of Living Matter, then located at University of Lausanne, and in 2003, she graduated with a PhD on cryo atomic force microscopy. For postdoctoral studies she went to work at University of California, Berkeley with Jan Liphardt. In 2008, she became an assistant professor at EPFL where she established the Laboratory of Nanoscale Biology. In 2015, she was promoted as an associate professor.

Research 

Radenovic's area of research is the development of experimental techniques for the study of molecular and cell biology making use of biosensors and optical imaging. In particular, she is interested in single-molecule biophysics.

Her research follows three main trajectories. First, she employs nanopores applied on suspended 2D material membranes, standard silicon-nitride membranes, and in glass nanocapillaries to study and manipulate single molecules. Then, Radenovic studies the function of single molecules, especially protein and nucleic acid interactions, via optical tweezers, optical wrench system, anti-Brownian electrokinetic trap, and a combination of nanopores or nanocapillaries with optical tweezers. Finally, based on single molecule localization microscopy, she designs super-resolution optical microscopes to extract quantitative information on single molecules.

Selected publications

References

External links 

 Website of the Laboratory of Nanoscale Biology
 
 Citation data from Researcher ID

21st-century Swiss scientists
21st-century Croatian scientists
Croatian emigrants to Switzerland
Swiss women engineers
21st-century women engineers
Women bioengineers
University of Zagreb alumni
University of Lausanne alumni
Academic staff of the École Polytechnique Fédérale de Lausanne
1975 births
Living people
Swiss biophysicists
Croatian physicists
Women biophysicists